A car bomb is a type of explosive device.

Car bomb may also refer to:

 Car Bomb (band), an American metal band
 Irish car bomb (cocktail), an alcoholic drink, sometimes referred to simply as a "car bomb"
 Daniel Carcillo (born 1985), hockey player for the Chicago Blackhawks nicknamed "Car Bomb"